Les Schwab Tire Centers is a tire retail chain operating in the western United States. Founded in 1952, the company is named for founder Les Schwab and is headquartered in the Central Oregon city of Bend. The private company employs over 7,000 people in nine western states.

History
Les Schwab founded the company with a single store in Prineville, Oregon, when he bought OK Rubber Welders in 1952. Corporate headquarters were moved from Prineville to Bend in 2008. From 1964 until 2011, the firm offered an innovative February "Free-Beef" promotion, to boost sales during slow late-winter months.

The company was sued by the Equal Employment Opportunity Commission in 2006 over allegations of gender-based job discrimination. The EEOC suit claimed the company denied women top management positions in the company and noted that at the time of the filing there was but a single female assistant store manager. They were also sued by former employees over the same allegations in a class action lawsuit filed the same year.  The federal case was settled in 2010.

On December 12, 2006, Dick Borgman became CEO of the company. That year the company ranked as the 318th largest private company according to Forbes. As of 2007, the chain operates more than 410 stores in Alaska, California, Idaho, Montana, Nevada, Oregon, Utah, and Washington.  The company does more than $1.6 billion in sales each year, and is the second largest independent tire retailer in the United States. Founder Les Schwab died in May 2007, with ownership remaining within the family, then chairman Phil Wick died in 2010. Les Schwab Tires entered the Denver metropolitan area with five stores in October 2012, the first in Colorado, bringing the total number of company owned stores to 374. In September 2020, CEO Jack Cuniff announced that the company would be sold to a San Francisco investment fund. The sale, to Meritage Group LP, was finalized in November 2020.

Operations

In addition to tires, the company sells a variety of other auto parts and auto-related services, including brakes and shocks. In 2008, Forbes magazine ranked Les Schwab as the 324th largest privately held company in the country. Modern Tire Dealer has called Les Schwab "arguably the most respected independent tire store chain in the United States." The company closes all of its stores on Sundays, and employees were formally known for running to customer vehicles when they pull in to park. 
.

See also
 List of companies based in Oregon

References

External links
Profile of founder Les Schwab
Les Schwab and Conservation Partnerships

Privately held companies based in Oregon
American companies established in 1952
Retail companies established in 1952
Automotive part retailers of the United States
Automotive repair shops of the United States
Companies based in Bend, Oregon
1952 establishments in Oregon